The Arrowhead Region is located in the northeastern part of the U.S. state of Minnesota, so called because of its pointed shape. The predominantly rural region encompasses  of land area and includes Carlton, Cook, Lake and Saint Louis counties. Its population at the 2000 census was 248,425 residents. Primary industries in the region include tourism and iron mining.

The area is one of several distinct regions of Minnesota. The region's largest cities are Duluth, Hibbing, Cloquet, Virginia, Grand Rapids, Hermantown, and International Falls.

Waterways

The Arrowhead Region contains three watersheds, the Lake Superior Basin, the Mississippi River Basin, and the Hudson Bay (Rainy River) Basin.  A unique geological feature is a point north of Hibbing, Minn. from where water has the potential to flow any one of three ways.  The only other location that this phenomenon occurs within North America is at Glacier National Park in Montana.

Waterways have played an important role in the history of the Arrowhead Region, to include the delineation of the United States and Canadian Borders using the Pigeon and Rainy Rivers and numerous other connected waterways as the boundary.  This same route has been used for centuries by fur traders for the transportation of furs, trade goods, communication, and ideas.  Another significant water trade route to the interior is the St. Louis River.  This route could be followed to the present day Mesabi Iron Range or could be transferred to the Mississippi River using the historic Savannah Portage.  These two waterways made up the main routes from Lake Superior to the "interior," or lands west of the Great Lakes.

Etymology 

A 1925 map of Northeastern Minnesota, created by the A & E Supply Company of Duluth, mentions the Arrowhead Region.

The term "The Arrowhead Country" appeared on a medal for the American Legion's 9th Annual Convention in Minnesota, taking place from August 8–10, 1927 in Hibbing.  The reverse reads "The Arrowhead Country".  The medal, made of a cupreous metal, is in the shape of Minnesota with a Native American style projectile point ("Arrowhead") covering the northeastern portion of the state.

A 1929 map titled "The Arrowhead of Minnesota" illustrates a stylized representation of important aspects in Northeastern Minnesota history, including geology and iron mining.  It was published by the Hibbing branch of the American Association of University Women.

Delineation 

A 1924 contest to name the then-unnamed region defined the region as "all or parts of the following counties: Cook, Lake, St. Louis, Carlton, Itasca, Aitkin, Koochiching, Beltrami, Crow Wing, Hubbard, and Cass."

The region is often defined as the counties of northeastern Minnesota.  Occasionally, Douglas County, in the northwestern part of Wisconsin, is included in modern maps or definitions.  The three main of the region  are St. Louis, Lake, and Cook counties in Minnesota.  These three are the northeasternmost counties in the state.  When an expanded definition is made, it often includes all or parts of Koochiching, Itasca, and Carlton counties of Minnesota — the other counties adjacent to St. Louis County to the west and south.

The most far reaching definitions, either on maps or in description, include Beltrami, Crow Wing, Hubbard, and Cass counties.  These are all to the west or southwest of St. Louis, Lake, and Cook counties.

Other attempts at geographically defining the Arrowhead have use land cover and vegetation type, hydrology, and resource extraction (logging and mining), as well as trying to make the defined area fit into a generalized arrowhead shape.

Economy
The Arrowhead Region is quite rugged and dotted with thousands of lakes surrounded by boreal forest, and is home to Voyageurs National Park, the Boundary Waters Canoe Area Wilderness, and the Superior Hiking Trail, which lie amidst the Superior National Forest.  The Arrowhead also contains Minnesota's only mountain range, the Sawtooth Mountains.  For these reasons, a large portion of the economy depends on tourism—the region is a common vacation destination for residents of the Minneapolis–Saint Paul metropolitan region.

The other primary portion of the Arrowhead economy is the iron mining industry.  Taconite is mined on the Mesabi Range, shipped by train to Duluth, Silver Bay, and Two Harbors, and shipped by freighter from these ports to major metropolitan areas farther down the Great Lakes such as Chicago, Detroit, and Cleveland.  In the first half of the 20th century, iron was also mined on the Vermilion Range.

Politics
The Arrowhead Region is very receptive towards candidates from the Democratic Party in federal and statewide elections. None of the four main counties in the region have voted for a Republican presidential candidate since Cook County voted for George W. Bush in 2000.

See also
Glacial history of Minnesota
Iron Range
The Quad Cities

References

Counties of the Arrowhead Region, Minnesota United States Census Bureau

External links
Northland Connection Local website

Regions of Minnesota
Geography of Carlton County, Minnesota
Geography of Cook County, Minnesota
Geography of Lake County, Minnesota
Geography of St. Louis County, Minnesota